There have been at least three vessels that have served with the Brazilian Navy named Almirante Barroso, after Francisco Manuel Barroso, Baron of Amazonas:

, a corvette, launched in 1882, sank in 1893 on circumnavigation voyage
, former USS Philadelphia (CL-41), a Brooklyn-class cruiser sold to Brazil in 1951

See also

References 
 Gardiner, Robert, Roger Chesneau, and Eugene Kolesnik, eds. Conway's All the World's Fighting Ships 1860–1905. Annapolis, MD: Naval Institute Press, 1979. . .
 Gardiner, Robert and Randal Gray, eds. Conway's All the World's Fighting Ships 1906–1921. Annapolis, MD: Naval Institute Press, 1985. . OCLC .

Brazilian Navy ship names